East-West Rail (occasionally referred to as West-East Rail) is a proposed passenger rail project that would provide new service between Boston and Western Massachusetts, with stops including Worcester, Palmer, Springfield, Chester, and Pittsfield. The  route would use the former mainline of the Boston and Albany Railroad, which is now owned by CSX Transportation.

Current passenger rail services on the corridor are the MBTA Framingham/Worcester Line — which only operates between Boston and Worcester — and Amtrak's Lake Shore Limited, which operates between Boston South Station and Albany–Rensselaer station once-a-day in each direction. East-West Rail is intended to increase the speed and frequency of service on the corridor.

A western Massachusetts passenger corridor has been considered for over forty years. Under pressure from multiple constituencies in western Massachusetts—including elected officials, advocates and citizens—the Massachusetts Department of Transportation (MassDOT) moved forward with an East-West Rail study in 2018. Boston-area political leaders see East-West Rail as a solution to workforce and housing issues, while Western Massachusetts officials see expanded rail service as a link to Boston’s growing economy.

As proposed, East-West Rail would consist of both intercity and regional rail services using push-pull diesel locomotives. Amtrak has been named the preferred operator. New stations would be constructed in the towns of Palmer and Chester. , no timeline has been set for service implementation.

History

Previous services 

The Boston and Worcester Railroad was chartered June 23, 1831 and construction began in August 1832. The line opened in sections: to West Newton on April 16, 1834; to Wellesley on July 3; to Ashland on September 20; to Westborough in November 1834; and the full length to Worcester on July 4, 1835. The Western Railroad was chartered February 15, 1833 and incorporated March 15, 1833 to connect the B&W to the Hudson and Berkshire Railroad at the New York state line. Construction began in 1837, and the Eastern Division to the Connecticut River in Springfield opened on October 1, 1839. The Western Division, through the Berkshire Hills, opened in sections from both ends from the state line to Pittsfield May 4, 1841, West Springfield to Chester May 24, 1841, Springfield to West Springfield (across the Connecticut River) July 4, 1841, Pittsfield to "Summit" August 9, 1841, and Chester to Summit September 13, 1841.

In 1870, the east-west line operators were consolidated into the Boston and Albany Railroad. The New York Central and Hudson River Railroad leased the B&A for 99 years from July 1, 1900. This lease passed to the New York Central Railroad in 1914; throughout this, the B&A kept its own branding in the public eye. At its peak in 1912, the B&A operated 12 Boston-Albany round trips, one Boston-Pittsfield round trip, and as many as 10 Pittsfield-North Adams round trips. The NYC merged into Penn Central on February 1, 1968. By the early part of the 20th century, commuter rail service was provided east of Worcester, with intercity rail continuing on west. During the 1940s period of peak passenger volume, the New Haven Railroad (with the cooperation of the New York Central) ran several Boston-New York City trains along the route to Worcester and Springfield and then south. The service included an overnight train with sleeping car service. The last passenger service to run on the line before the creation of Amtrak was an unnamed Chicago-bound successor to the New York Central's New England States in April 30, 1971.

Decline 

The rise of automobile ownership and the construction of the I-90/Massachusetts Turnpike drastically reduced passenger demand on the Boston-Pittsfield corridor. B&A service was also cut due to financial problems in the late 1930s and again after World War II; by 1950, Pittsfield was served by eight Boston-Albany round trips per day. On April 24, 1960, stops west of Framingham except for Worcester, Palmer, Springfield, and Pittsfield were closed; Boston-Albany service via Pittsfield was reduced to just 3.5 daily round trips.

The NYC merged into Penn Central Railroad on February 1, 1968, followed by the New Haven on December 31. Penn Central continued to run the daily Boston-Albany train (the former, nameless New England States) through Pittsfield until April 30, 1971. The intercity trips were taken over by Amtrak on May 1, 1971. Service between Worcester and Albany along the Boston and Albany Railroad route was discontinued, leaving Pittsfield with no passenger rail service for the first time in 130 years. Two weeks after taking over service, Amtrak added the Boston-New Haven Bay State, which restored service on the B&A as far west as Springfield; however, this service proved unpopular and was discontinued on March 1, 1975. The MBTA began subsidizing Penn Central commuter rail service between Boston and Framingham in January 1973. On January 27, 1973, the MBTA acquired the line east of Framingham. Penn Central service beyond Framingham was discontinued October 27, 1975, as the state did not subsidize it. In response, Amtrak revived the New York-Chicago Lake Shore Limited on October 31, 1975, with a new section running on the Boston-Albany mainline and thus restoring service between Pittsfield and Boston.

Conrail took over Penn Central on April 1, 1976. On September 26, 1994, some rush hour trains started to serve Worcester on Conrail trackage (which became CSX trackage on June 1, 1999), extending to other times beginning on December 14, 1996. Prior to 2004, select Northeast Regional trains would offer a Springfield-Boston service via an inland route. This route traveled northward from New Haven through central Connecticut and western Massachusetts, passing through Hartford and Springfield, then turned eastward and through Worcester and Framingham en route to South Station. With the electrification of the Northeast Corridor in 2000, Springfield–Boston service along the slower Inland Route (2:05 hours longer from Boston–New York City) was gradually reduced, with the last train discontinued in 2004. The MBTA acquired the rest of the line from Framingham to Worcester as part of an agreement announced in 2009. A 2012 agreement transferred ownership and control of the balance of the corridor, from Worcester to South Station in Boston, from CSX to the Commonwealth of Massachusetts.

Current services 
CSX owns and operates the segment of the East-West Rail corridor between Pittsfield and Worcester. Amtrak's Lake Shore Limited provides a single round trip per day with stops at Pittsfield, Springfield, Worcester and Boston within the state of Massachusetts. The MBTA operates commuter services between South Station and Worcester Union Station as the Framingham/Worcester line. Springfield Union Station remains a major hub for New England services including the Valley Flyer, Vermonter, Northeast Regional, Amtrak’s Hartford Line and CTrail’s Hartford Line. Until 2022, Pittsfield was only serviced by Lake Shore Limited trains; the Berkshire Flyer was introduced in the Summer of 2022 as a seasonal weekend-only New York City-Pittsfield extension of Amtrak's Empire Service. The service was funded by the Massachusetts Senate to facilitate tourism to the Berkshires.

Current route limitations 
There are several factors that have limited the expansion of east-to-west passenger services on the Pittsfield-Boston corridor. Unlike the MBTA commuter rail network, the state of Massachusetts does not own the trackage between Pittsfield and Worcester; arrangements would have to be made with CSX in order to run more passenger trains on the line. Passenger and freight shared-use rail operations create challenges for scheduling, dispatch, and the need for suitable track infrastructure and signal equipment; passenger services that operate on freight rail lines often require investment to install some combination of double-tracking, passing sidings, new track, and higher-capacity signal systems. Amtrak has the right to provide passenger service on freight-owned lines while the host railroad has the right to set the terms for an operating agreement; however, the MBTA and MassDOT are not eligible to directly utilize these legal provisions.

Much of the former double-track between Worcester and Pittsfield had been removed during the 1980s. The 52-mile Springfield to Pittsfield segment of the corridor includes 13.5 miles of single track rail alignment and the Worcester to Springfield segment includes mostly single-track rail alignment, with 33 miles of single track and only 21 miles of double-track. In order to facilitate more frequent rail operations, most of the former double-tracked sections would have been restored. Signaling and communication implementation also presents an issue- CSX has implemented Interoperable Electronic Train Management System (I-ETMS) between Pittsfield and Worcester, while the MBTA uses the Advanced Civil Speed Enforcement System (ACSES) between Worcester and Boston. For any trains operating in both CSX and MBTA jurisdictions, locomotives will need both systems to safely operate.

East-west service studies

Northern New England Intercity Rail Initiative Study (2013-2016) 
In 2016 the Massachusetts Department of Transportation and the Vermont Agency of Transportation, in coordination with the Connecticut Department of Transportation, completed a three-year feasibility and planning study known as the Northern New England Intercity Rail Initiative. The lead consultant for the study was HDR Engineering. The firm AECOM was the primary sub-consultant. The study recommended a Boston-to-Springfield-to-New Haven intercity route with a maximum speed of 79 miles-per-hour. Despite this, the proposal was never pursued, and funding for the project was never allocated.

East-West Passenger Rail Study (2018-2021) 
In January 2021, MassDOT completed a two-year study, known as the East-West Passenger Rail Study, that examined the feasibility of passenger rail service from Boston to Springfield and Pittsfield. Original considerations for an East-West Rail corridor considered either using the Boston and Albany mainline or the construction of a brand new mainline that would parallel the Mass Pike. The study preferred the Boston and Albany mainline route and recommended three out of six possible build alternatives which recommended between seven and nine new round-trip trains between Boston, Springfield and Pittsfield on this corridor. Proposed line upgrades include double tracking, signaling upgrades and rail upgrades to facilitate higher speeds. Each of the three build alternatives call for stations in Palmer and Chester. Chester and Palmer had train stations along the rail line in the past, but those are no longer extant and would require new stations. Service delivery indicates diesel push-pull operations and call for top speeds of either 60 or 109 miles per hour. Other build alternatives considered a Springfield-Boston route with bus transfers to Pittsfield and high-speed rail; however, these options were ruled out.

 Final Alternative 3 would provide direct passenger rail service between Pittsfield and Boston along a shared track / shared CSX and MBTA corridor. Up to eight round trips (seven new East-West round trips) could be provided, with an average travel time of 3:09 hours between Pittsfield and Boston, and 1:57 hour between Springfield and Boston. Additional new stations would be built in Chester and Palmer. The price is estimated at $2.4 billion.
 Final Alternative 4 would provide direct passenger rail service between Pittsfield and Springfield along a shared track / shared CSX corridor, along an independent passenger track between Springfield and Worcester, and along a shared track/shared MBTA corridor between Worcester and Boston. Up to 10 round trips (nine new East-West round trips) could be provided, with an average travel time of 2:59 hours between Pittsfield and Boston, and 1:47 hour between Springfield and Boston. Additional new stations would include Chester and Palmer. The price is estimated at $3.9 billion.
 Hybrid Alternative 4/5 would provide direct passenger rail service between Pittsfield and Springfield along a shared track /shared CSX corridor, along an independent passenger track with high-speed shortcuts between Springfield and Worcester, and along a shared track/shared MBTA corridor between Worcester and Boston. Up to 10 round trips (nine new East-West round trips) could be provided, with an average travel time of 2:49 hours between Pittsfield and Boston, and 1:37 hour between Springfield and Boston. Additional new stations would include Chester and Palmer. The cost is $4.6 billion.

Amtrak ConnectsUS Plan (2021) 
In Summer 2021, Amtrak published a comprehensive fifteen-year service expansion plan that included a new service between Albany and Boston; this planned service is considered as an extension of MassDOT’s East-West proposal. The service would operate similar to Amtrak’s other diesel intercity services that run on freight trackage such as the Pennsylvanian and Empire Service. There is currently no indication for when Amtrak will implement Boston-Albany services.

Northern Tier Passenger Rail (2019-2023) 
A proposal known as Northern Tier Passenger Rail is in the early stages of planning; a corridor study was initialized in 2019. The corridor would extend the Fitchburg Line westward through Greenfield and terminate at North Adams, following the existing CSX (formerly Pan Am) rail corridor. The line would connect Berkshire, Franklin, Worcester, Middlesex, and Suffolk counties in northwestern Massachusetts with North Station. In January 2023, MassDOT announced that the total price for corridor track upgrades would cost between $1.044 billion to $2.187 billion and would take three years to construct. Suggested intermediate stations include Shelburne Falls, Millers Falls, Orange, Gardner, and Cambridge. The line is currently planned for diesel service provided by either Amtrak or MassDOT with five round trips per day; there is currently no timeline for service implementation.

Restoration planning 
In Spring 2022, the state of Massachusetts utilized CSX's intent to purchase Pan Am railways as leverage to get CSX to cooperate on improved passenger rail; as a result, CSX agreed to conditions emplaced by the Surface Transportation Board for facilitating passenger rail between Boston and Pittsfield. In July 2022, the Massachusetts Senate committed $275 million to design, engineering and construction expenses, among other investments for East-West Rail within an amendment to an infrastructure bond. Former governor Charlie Baker expressed heavy support for the creation of a dedicated western Massachusetts passenger rail authority be established to secure funding and govern the project; the authority would be dissolved upon completion of the project and service operations would be handled by Amtrak or the MBTA. Governor Maura Healy indicated plans to appoint a dedicated East-West Rail director that would oversee all major construction and operational contracts.

The Western Massachusetts Passenger Rail Commission was created in summer of 2022 to develop a permanent body to manage and enhance passenger rail through the region.  The 19-member commission will review proposals and cost-benefit analysis from the 2021 East-West Rail study. The Baker administration intended to fund the project with federal money available to rail projects in the 2021 Bipartisan Infrastructure Law; the law has $9 billion for Massachusetts and $66 billion for Amtrak. The state indicated that it will apply for a part of $1.4 billion in Consolidated Rail Infrastructure and Safety Improvement (CRISI) grant funding. Several preliminary projects are currently underway to facilitate new east-to-west services; this includes the construction of a second platform at Worcester Union Station.

In December 2022, MassDOT along with Amtrak and CSX applied for $108 million in federal transportation money to help fund improvements along the 53 miles of railroad between Springfield and Worcester. The track upgrades will increase speeds on the corridor up to 80 miles per hour. It is planned to add two daily Amtrak trips between Boston, Worcester and Springfield as an interim phase of inland East-West Rail service; however, politicians in Berkshire County were immediately critical of this plan for not including interim inland service to Pittsfield as well. In addition, a track siding will be built in Grafton that will improve the efficiency and capacity of freight interchange with the Grafton & Upton Railroad.  

In March 2023, governor Healey announced that a state budget proposal would allocate $12.5 million towards initial East-West Rail construction; $8.5 million would go towards track improvements at Pittsfield station while $4 million would go towards study and design for a new station in Palmer. The budget also earmarks $650,000 for five full-time employees dedicated to East-West Rail planning, including a project director.

Project concerns 

In 2022 the advocacy group TransitMatters released a plan called "90 Minutes To Springfield" which called into question aspects of MassDOT's East-West Rail Study. TransitMatters called MassDOT cost estimates for East-West Rail service "bloated" and they questioned why MassDOT's East-West Rail Study included no improvements for the MBTA Framingham/Worcester Line. The TransitMatters plan called for the East-West Rail project, along with all future rail projects, to be fully electrified to meet state environmental goals.

At times media outlets have presented the project as an extension of the MBTA commuter rail or a high-speed rail corridor which has led to the project being publicly perceived differently from its proposed intent.

State Representative Smitti Pignateli said in an editorial in 2022 that East-West Rail should be integrated as a part of a greater vision for statewide regional rail under the authority of a single statewide agency. At a meeting of the Western Massachusetts Passenger Rail Commission on January 24, 2023, State Representative Natalie Blais said that it was important there is western Massachusetts-based control for East-West Rail and that if the service is managed from Boston the interest of people living in western parts of the state might not be properly represented.

Proposed stations

See also 
 South Coast Rail
 Central Corridor Rail Line
 Connecticut River Line
 Lackawanna Cut-Off Restoration Project

References

External links 
 East-West Rail in Massachusetts – Trains In The Valley
 East-West Passenger Rail Study  (2018–2020) – MassDOT

Passenger rail transportation in Massachusetts
Proposed railway lines in Massachusetts
Proposed Amtrak routes